A national championship in the highest level of college football in the United States, currently the NCAA Division I Football Bowl Subdivision (FBS), is a designation awarded annually by various organizations to their selection of the best college football team. Division I FBS football is the only National Collegiate Athletic Association (NCAA) sport for which the NCAA does not sanction a yearly championship event. As such, it is sometimes unofficially referred to as a "mythical national championship".

Due to the lack of an official NCAA title, determining the nation's top college football team has often engendered controversy. A championship team is independently declared by multiple individuals and organizations, often referred to as "selectors". These choices are not always unanimous. In 1969 even President of the United States Richard Nixon made a selection by announcing, ahead of the season-ending "game of the century" between No. 1 Texas and No. 2 Arkansas, that the winner would receive a presidential plaque commemorating them as national champions. Texas went on to win, 15–14.

While the NCAA has never officially endorsed a championship team, it has documented the choices of some selectors in its official NCAA Football Bowl Subdivision Records publication. In addition, various analysts have independently published their own choices for each season. These opinions can often diverge with others as well as individual schools' claims to national titles, which may or may not correlate to the selections published elsewhere. Currently, two of the most widely recognized national champion selectors are the Associated Press (AP), which conducts a poll of sportswriters, and the Coaches Poll, a survey of active members of the American Football Coaches Association (AFCA).

Since 1992, various consortia of major bowl games have aimed to invite the top two teams at the end of the regular season (as determined by internal rankings, or aggregates of the major polls and other statistics) to compete in what is intended to be the de facto national championship game. The current iteration of this practice, the College Football Playoff, selects four teams to participate in national semi-finals hosted by two of six partner bowl games, with their winners advancing to the College Football Playoff National Championship.

History 
 

The concept of a national championship in college football dates to the early years of the sport in the late 19th century. Some of the earliest contemporaneous rankings can be traced to Caspar Whitney in Harper's Weekly, J. Parmly Paret in Outing, Charles Patterson, and New York newspaper The Sun.

Claimed intercollegiate championships were limited to various selections and rankings, as the nature of the developing and increasingly violent full-contact sport made it impossible to schedule a post-season tournament to determine an "official" or undisputed champion. National championships in this era were well understood to be "mythical".

Beyond rankings in newspaper columns, awards and trophies began to be presented to teams. In 1917 members of the 9–0 Georgia Tech squad were given gold footballs with the inscription "National Champions" by alumni at their post-season banquet. The Veteran Athletes of Philadelphia put up the Bonniwell Trophy for the national championship in 1919 under the stipulation that it was only "to be awarded in such years as produces a team whose standing is so preeminent as to make its selection as champion of America beyond dispute." Notre Dame was the first to be awarded the trophy, in 1924.

Professor Frank G. Dickinson of Illinois developed the first mathematical ranking system to be widely popularized. Chicago clothing manufacturer Jack F. Rissman donated a trophy for the system's national championship in 1926 onward, first awarded to Stanford prior to their tie with Alabama in the Rose Bowl. A curious Knute Rockne, then coach of Notre Dame, convinced Dickinson and Rissman to  backdate the Rissman Trophy two seasons; thus Notre Dame is engraved on the trophy for 1924 and Dartmouth for 1925. The Rissman Trophy was retired by Notre Dame's three wins in 1924, 1929, and 1930; the Knute Rockne Memorial Trophy was put into competition for 1931 following the untimely death of the legendary coach. The popularity of the Dickinson System kicked off a succession of mathematical rankings carried in newspapers and magazines such as the Houlgate System, Azzi Ratem rankings, Dunkel Power Index, Williamson System, and Litkenhous Ratings.

Two short-lived national championship trophies were contemporaries of the Dickinson System awards. The Albert Russel Erskine Trophy was won twice by Note Dame in 1929 and 1930, as voted by 250 sportswriters from around the country. The large silver Erskine trophy was last awarded to USC on the field in Pasadena following their "national championship game" victory over Tulane in the 1932 Rose Bowl. The Toledo Cup was meant to be a long-running traveling trophy, but was promptly permanently retired by Minnesota's threepeat in 1934, 1935, and 1936.

College football's foremost historian Parke H. Davis compiled a list of "National Champion Foot Ball Teams" for the 1934 edition of Spalding's Official Foot Ball Guide. Davis selected national champions for each year dating back to college football's inaugural season in 1869, for which he selected the sole competitors Princeton and Rutgers as co-champions. Similar retrospective analysis was undertaken in the 1940s by Bill Schroeder of the Helms Athletic Foundation and in Deke Houlgate's The Football Thesaurus in 1954.

The Associated Press began polling sportswriters in 1936 to obtain rankings. Alan J. Gould, the creator of the AP Poll, named Minnesota, Princeton, and SMU co-champions in 1935, and polled writers the following year, which resulted in a national championship for Minnesota. The AP's main competition, United Press, created the first Coaches Poll in 1950.  For that year and the next three, the AP and UP agreed on the national champion.  The first "split" national championship between the major polls occurred in 1954, when the writers selected Ohio State and the coaches chose UCLA. The two polls have disagreed 11 times since 1950.

Both wire servies originally conducted their final polls at the end of the regular season and prior to any bowl games being played. This changed when the AP Poll champion was crowned after the bowls for 1965 and then in 1968 onward. The Coaches Poll began awarding post-bowl championships in 1974. National champions crowned by pre-bowl polls who subsequently lost their bowl game offered an opportunity for other teams to claim the title based on different selectors' awards and rankings, such as the post-bowl FWAA Grantland Rice Award or Helms Athletic Foundation title.

Post-bowl polls allowed for the possibility of a "national championship game" to finally settle question on the gridiron. But a number of challenges made it difficult to schedule even the season's top two teams to play in a single post-season bowl game, let alone all of the deserving teams. Calls for a college football playoff were frequently made by head coach Joe Paterno of Penn State, whose independent teams finished the 1968, 1969, and 1973 seasons unbeaten, untied, and with Orange Bowl victories yet were left without a single major national title.

The 1980s were marked by a succession of satisfying national championship games in the Orange Bowl and Fiesta Bowl, but the 1990s began with consecutive split AP Poll and Coaches Poll national titles in 1990 and 1991. The Bowl Coalition and then Bowl Alliance were formed to more reliably set up a No. 1 vs. No. 2 matchup in a bowl game on New Year's Day, but their efforts were hampered by the Rose Bowl's historic draw and contractual matchup between the Big Ten and Pac-10 conference champions.

The Bowl Championship Series in 1998 succeeded in finally bringing the Big Ten and Pac-10 into the fold with the other conferences for a combined BCS National Championship Game rotated amongst the Fiesta, Sugar, Orange, and Rose bowls and venues. BCS rankings originally incorporated the two major polls as well as a number of computer rankings to determine the end of season No. 1 vs. No. 2 matchup. Although the BCS era did regularly produce compelling matchups, the winnowing selection of the top two teams resulted in many BCS controversies, most notably 2003's split national championship caused by the BCS rankings leaving USC, No. 1 in both human polls, out of the Sugar Bowl. The BCS victors were awarded The Coaches' Trophy "crystal football" on the field immediately following the game.

In 2014 the College Football Playoff made its debut, facilitating a multi-game single-elimination tournament for the first time in college football history. Four teams are seeded by a 13–member selection committee rather than by existing polls or mathematical rankings. The two semifinal games are rotated among the New Year's Six bowl games, and the final is played a week later. The competition awards its own national championship trophy.

NCAA records book
Although the National Collegiate Athletic Association (NCAA) has never bestowed national championships in college football at the topmost level, it does maintain an official records book for the sport. The records book, with consultation from various college football historians, contains a list of "major selectors" of national championships from throughout the history of college football, along with their championship selections.

Major selectors
While many people and organizations have named national champions throughout the years, the selectors below are listed in the official NCAA Football Bowl Subdivision Records book as being "major selectors" of national championships. The criterion for the NCAA's designation is that the poll or selector be "national in scope, either through distribution in newspaper, television, radio and/or computer online". Former selectors, deemed instrumental in the sport of college football, and selectors that were included for the calculation of the BCS standing, are listed together.

The NCAA records book divides its major selectors into three categories: those determined by mathematical formula, human polls, and historical research. The BCS is additionally categorized as a hybrid between math and polls, and the CFP as a playoff system.

Math
The mathematical system is the oldest systematic selector of college football national champions.  Many of the math selectors were created during the "championship rush" of the 1920s and 1930s, beginning with Frank Dickinson's system, or during the dawn of the computer age in the 1990s.  Selectors are listed below with years selected retroactively in italics.

Notes

Poll
The poll has been the dominant national champion selection method since the inception of the AP Poll in 1936. The National Football Foundation merged its poll with UPI from 1991 to 1992, with USA Today from 1993 to 1996, and with the FWAA since 2014.

For many years, the national champions of various polls were selected before the annual bowl games were played, by AP (1936–1964 and 1966–1967), Coaches Poll (1950–1973), FWAA (1954), and NFF (1959–1970). In all other latter-day polls, champions were selected after bowl games.

During the BCS era, the winner of the BCS Championship Game was automatically awarded the national championship of the Coaches Poll and the National Football Foundation.

Selectors are listed below with years selected retroactively in italics. Poll selections that constitute a "Consensus National Championship" in 1950 or later, as designated by the NCAA, are listed in bold.

Notes

Research
College football historian Parke H. Davis is the only selector considered by the NCAA to have primarily used research in his selections.  Davis published his work in the 1934 edition of Spalding's Foot Ball Guide, naming retroactive national champions for the years 1869 to 1932 while naming Michigan and Princeton (his alma mater) contemporary co-champions for the 1933 season. In all, he selected 94 teams over 61 seasons as "National Champion Foot Ball Teams". For 21 of these teams (at 12 schools), he was the only major selector to choose them. Their schools use 17 of Davis' singular selections to claim national titles. His work has been criticized for having a heavy Eastern bias, with little regard for the South and the West Coast.

Hybrid
The Bowl Championship Series used a mathematical system that combined polls (Coaches and AP/Harris) and multiple computer rankings (including some individual selectors listed above) to determine a season ending matchup between its top two ranked teams in the BCS Championship Game. The champion of that game was contractually awarded the Coaches Poll and National Football Foundation championships.

Playoff
Unlike all selectors prior to 2014, the College Football Playoff does not use math, polls or research to select the participants. Rather, a 13-member committee selects and seeds the teams. The playoff system marked the first time any championship selector arranged a bracket competition to determine whom it would declare to be its champion.

Yearly national championship selections from major selectors
Below is a list of the national champions of college football since 1869 chosen by NCAA-designated "major selectors" listed in the official Football Bowl Subdivision Records publication.

Many teams did not have coaches as late as 1899. The first contemporaneous poll to include teams across the country and selection of a national champions can be traced to Caspar Whitney in 1901. The last retroactive selection in the list is Clyde Berryman's choice of Notre Dame for 1989.  The tie was removed from college football in 1995 and the last consensus champion with a tie in its record was Georgia Tech in 1990.

As designated by the official NCAA Football Bowl Subdivision Records publication:
 Champions included in this table are exclusively those named by an NCAA-designated "major selector" for the given year.
 Teams listed in italics indicate retroactively-applied championships.
 Teams listed in bold reflect the NCAA's designation as "Consensus National Champions" by virtue of their selection from 1950 onward by one or more of the following selectors: Associated Press, United Press/UPI, Football Writers Association of America, National Football Foundation, and USA Today.

A letter next to any season, team, record, coach or selector indicates a footnote that appears at the bottom of the table.

aParke H. Davis' selection for 1901, as published in the 1934 edition of Spalding's Foot Ball Guide, was Harvard. The NCAA Records Book states "Yale" for 1901, which is an error that has been perpetuated since the first appearance of Parke H. Davis' selections in the NCAA book about 1995.
bThe NCAA Football Bowl Subdivision Records book lists Sagarin as having selected Tennessee, while Sagarin's official website gives Ohio State as its 1998 selection.
cThe FWAA stripped USC of its 2004 Grantland Rice Trophy and vacated the selection of its national champion for 2004. The BCS also vacated USC's participation in the 2005 Orange Bowl and USC's 2004 BCS National Championship, and the AFCA Coaches Poll Coaches' Trophy was returned.
dRecord does not count wins against UCLA, or against Oklahoma in the BCS Championship game on January 4, 2005, as they were vacated by the NCAA.
eThe NCAA Football Bowl Subdivision Records book lists Dunkel as having selected LSU, while Dunkel's official website gives USC as its 2007 selection.
fThe NCAA Football Bowl Subdivision Records book lists CCR as having selected LSU, while CCR's official website gives USC as its 2003 selection.
gThe NCAA Football Bowl Subdivision Records book lists DeVold (DeS) as having selected Florida, while DeVold's official website gives Ohio State as its 2006 selection.
hThe NCAA Football Bowl Subdivision Records book lists R(FACT) as having selected Florida, while R(FACT)'s official website gives co-champions Ohio State and Florida as its 2006 selection.
iThe NCAA Football Bowl Subdivision Records book lists Wolfe as having selected Florida, while Wolfe's official website gives Utah as its 2008 selection.
kThe NCAA Football Bowl Subdivision Records book lists CCR as having selected Alabama, while CCR's official website gives LSU as its 2011 selection.
mThe NCAA Football Bowl Subdivision Records book lists Anderson & Hester (A&H) as having selected LSU, while A&H's official website gives Missouri as its 2007 selection.
nThe NCAA Football Bowl Subdivision Records book lists Anderson & Hester (A&H) as having selected Alabama, while A&H's official website gives LSU as its 2011 selection.
oThe NCAA Football Bowl Subdivision Records book lists the Williamson System as having selected TCU and LSU as co-champions for 1935. However the system's post-bowl final rankings published in January 1936 show TCU first, SMU second, and LSU third. The accompanying column written by Paul B. Williamson states "There was no undisputable national champion in 1935".
pThe NCAA Football Bowl Subdivision Records book lists the Williamson System as having selected LSU in 1936. However the system's post-bowl final rankings show Minnesota first and LSU fourth.
qThe NCAA Football Bowl Subdivision Records book lists the Williamson System as having selected Pittsburgh in 1937. However the system's post-bowl final rankings show California first and Pittsburgh second.
rThe NCAA Football Bowl Subdivision Records book lists the Williamson System as having selected TCU alone in 1938. However the system's post-bowl final rankings show a tie between TCU and Tennessee.
sThe NCAA Football Bowl Subdivision Records book lists the Williamson System as having selected Tennessee in 1940. However the system's post-bowl final rankings show Stanford first and Tennessee sixth.
tKansas' defeat of Missouri was overturned by the Big Eight Conference on December 8 (ineligible player). The reversal erased the only loss on Missouri's record.

Total championship selections from major selectors by school
The national title count listed below is a culmination of all championship awarded since 1869, regardless of "consensus" or non-consensus status, as listed in the table above according to the selectors deemed to be "major" as listed in the official NCAA Football Bowl Subdivision Records.

The totals can be said to be disputed. Individual schools may claim national championships not accounted for by the NCAA Football Bowl Subdivision Records or may not claim national championship selections that do appear in the official NCAA Football Bowl Subdivision Records (see National championship claims by school below).

Major polls

National championship selectors came to be dominated by two competing news agencies in the later half of the 20th century: the Associated Press (AP) and United Press International (UPI).

These wire services began ranking college football teams in weekly polls, which were then promptly published in the sports sections of each agency's subscribing newspapers across the country. The team ranking No. 1 in each agency's final poll of the season was awarded that agency's national championship.

National championships are often stated to be "consensus" when the two major polls are in agreement with their selections.

AP Poll

The AP college football poll has a long history. The news media began running their own polls of sports writers to determine who was, by popular opinion, the best football team in the country at the end of the season. One of the earliest such polls was the AP College Football Poll, first run in 1934 (compiled and organized by Charles Woodroof, former SEC Assistant Director of Media Relations, but not recognized in the official NCAA Football Bowl Subdivision Records) and then continuously from 1936. The first major nationwide poll for ranking college football teams, the Associated Press is probably the most well-known and widely circulated among all of history’s polls. Due to the long-standing historical ties between individual college football conferences and high-paying bowl games like the Rose Bowl and Orange Bowl, the NCAA has never held a tournament or championship game to determine the champion of what is now the highest division, NCAA Division I, Football Bowl Subdivision (the Division I, Football Championship Subdivision and lower divisions do hold championship tournaments). As a result, the public and the media began to take the leading vote-getter in the final AP Poll as the national champion for that season.

In the AP Poll's early years, the final poll of sportswriters was taken prior to any bowl games and sometimes even prior to the top teams' final games of the regular season. In 1938, the poll was extended for one week after Notre Dame, No. 1 in the scheduled "final" poll, subsequently lost to rival USC.

Following the 1947 season the AP held a special post-bowl poll with only two teams on the ballot, Notre Dame and Michigan, but stated that the result would not supersede that of the final poll conducted following the end of the regular season. The rivals, both unbeaten and untied, had been ranked No. 1 and No. 2 respectively in the final poll. January voters were impressed by Michigan's 49–0 win over common opponent USC in the Rose Bowl and elevated the Wolverines above the Irish in the special post-bowl poll.

The AP champion would lose its bowl game five times, following the 1950, 1951, 1953, 1960, and 1964 seasons.

In 1965 the AP decided to delay the season's final poll until after New Year's Day, citing the proliferation of bowl games and the involvement of eight of the poll's current top ten teams in post-season play. In the next season, 1966, neither of the top two teams were attending bowl games so no post-bowl poll was taken, even after two-time defending AP national champion No. 3 Alabama won the Sugar Bowl and finished the season unbeaten and untied. In 1967 the final poll crowning USC national champion was taken before No. 2 Tennessee or No. 3 Oklahoma had even played their final games of the regular season, and well before those two teams met in the Orange Bowl.

In 1968 the final poll was again delayed until after the bowl games so that No. 1 Ohio State could meet No. 2 USC in a "dream match" in the Rose Bowl. Every subsequent season's final AP Poll would be released after the bowl games. UPI did not follow suit until the 1974 season; in the overlapping years, the Coaches Poll champion lost their bowl game in 1965, 1970, and 1973. The AP's earlier move to crown a post-bowl champion paid off, as in all three years the losing team had also been the No. 1 team in the pre-bowl penultimate AP rankings.

The AP Poll was used as a component of the Bowl Championship Series computer ranking formula starting in 1998, but without any formal agreement in place like the contract made between the BCS and the Coaches Poll. For the 2003 season the AP Poll caused a split national title and BCS controversy when it awarded its national championship to No. 1 USC instead of BCS champion LSU. In December 2004 the AP opted out of the BCS formula, requesting that the BCS "discontinue its unauthorized use of the AP poll as a component of BCS rankings", in response to three AP voters from Texas elevating Texas above California into the Rose Bowl in the last regular season AP Poll.

In the playoff era, the Associated Press has continued to award the AP Trophy to the No. 1 team in the final AP Poll. AP rankings are not incorporated in the CFP selection committee's seeding, and voting AP sportswriters are not obligated to award their title to the winner of the CFP national championship game. In 2015 the Associated Press's global sports editor stated that "it is not out of the realm of possibility that a team could win the AP national championship without winning the College Football Playoff's national championship", although that scenario has yet to occur.

Coaches Poll

News agency United Press (UP), the main competitor to the Associated Press, began conducting its own college football ratings during the 1950 season. The wire service came to be known as United Press International (UPI) following a merger with International News Service in 1958.

The weekly ranking was a joint polling effort between the news agency and the American Football Coaches Association (AFCA), with UP/UPI sports writers gathering and tabulating the coaches' votes and publishing the results in newspapers across the nation.

The UP/UPI rankings were originally conducted by polling 35 of the nation's college football coaches. The coaches were chosen to represent every major football conference, with 5 coaches from each of 7 regions, in an apparent effort to combat the perceived East Coast bias of the rival AP Poll's constituent sports writers.

Each season's final Coaches Poll was initially published following the regular season and did not take bowl game results into account; the UP/UPI national champion lost its bowl game 8 times between 1950 and 1973. Since the 1974 season the poll has awarded its national championship following the postseason bowls. That same year the AFCA voted to thereafter not rank any team currently under NCAA or conference-sanctioned probation.

Following the decline of UPI in the 1980s, the AFCA ended their 42-year relationship with the wire service in 1991. The Coaches Poll continued, with new sponsorship and distribution partners, as the USA Today/CNN poll (1991–1996), USA Today/ESPN poll (1997–2004), USA Today poll (2005–2014), and USA Today/Amway poll (2014–present).

The Bowl Championship Series included the Coaches Poll as a major factor in its ranking formula. In return, voting AFCA members were contractually obligated to award their Coaches Poll national championship selections to the winner of the BCS National Championship Game. Lacking its own dedicated trophy, the BCS champion was awarded The Coaches' Trophy on the field immediately following the game.

Poll era national championships by school (1936–present)
The following table contains the national championships that have been recognized by the final AP or Coaches Poll. Originally both the AP and Coaches poll champions were crowned after the regular season, but since 1968 and 1974 respectively, both polls crown their champions after the bowl games are completed (with the exception of the 1965 season). The BCS champion was automatically awarded the Coaches Poll championship. Of the current 120+ Football Bowl Subdivision (FBS, formerly Division I-A) schools, only 30 have won at least a share of a national title by the AP or Coaches poll. Of these 30 teams, only 20 teams have won multiple titles. Of the 20 teams, only 7 have won five or more national titles: Alabama, Notre Dame, Oklahoma, USC, Miami (FL), Nebraska, and Ohio State. The years listed in the table below indicate a national championship selection by the AP or Coaches Poll. The selections are noted with (AP) or (Coaches) when a national champion selection differed between the two polls for that particular season, which has occurred in twelve different seasons (including 2004, for which the coaches selection was rescinded) since the polls first came to coexist in 1950.

† USC's 2004 BCS National Championship was vacated by the BCS and the AFCA Coaches Trophy returned.
‡ Retroactively awarded in 2016 by AFCA Blue Ribbon Panel. Oklahoma State was the only school to apply for the award.

Split national championships

The AP Poll and Coaches Poll have picked different final national poll leaders at the end of 11 different seasons since their first concurrent polls in 1950. This situation is referred to as a "split" national championship.

National championship games

College football fans and administrators have long sought to match the No. 1 vs. No. 2 teams in an end-of-season national championship game to determine an undisputed national champion on the gridiron.

Historic occurrences

Throughout most of the 20th century, a number of challenges made it impossible to ordinarily schedule the two top teams for a single post-season title fight:

 Some schools, most notably Notre Dame, declined to play in bowl games for many years.
 Conference tie-ins prevented certain conference champions from ever meeting in a post-season bowl game.
 "No repeat" rules prevented teams from playing in their conference's bowl two seasons in a row.
 At-large bowl game invitations were extended in mid-November, locking in teams with subsequent late-season losses.

Through luck and fortuitous scheduling, a "national championship game" was occasionally able to settle the matter on the field, as described in some contemporaneous reports.

Bowl Coalition (1992–1994)

Following back-to-back years of split AP and Coaches Poll national champions in 1990, between Colorado (AP) and Georgia Tech (Coaches), and 1991, between Miami (FL) (AP) and Washington (Coaches), the Bowl Coalition was formed in 1992 to increase the probability of a No. 1 vs. No. 2 national championship game matchup in one of the Coalition's participating bowls.

The Coalition's rules retained traditional bowl game conference tie-ins but provided some flexibility for scheduling a No. 1 vs. No. 2 matchup between two teams selected from among the champions of the ACC, Big East, Big Eight, SEC, and SWC conferences, or independent Notre Dame, in the Cotton Bowl, Fiesta Bowl, Orange Bowl, or Sugar Bowl.

The Big Ten and Pac-10 conferences were notably not members of the Bowl Coalition, with their champions retaining their traditional and contractual matchup in the Rose Bowl. Likewise, mid-major teams had no route to the Bowl Coalition National Championship Game.

Bowl Alliance (1995–1997)

In 1995 the Bowl Alliance replaced the Bowl Coalition. Going further than the Coalition, the Alliance guaranteed a postseason matchup of the No. 1 and No. 2 ranked teams of its same five conference champions plus Notre Dame. Beginning in 1996, the Big 12 champion joined the Alliance in place of the champions of the disbanded Big Eight and Southwest conferences.

Unlike the Coalition, the Alliance eliminated traditional conference tie-ins to its associated bowls. The Bowl Alliance national championship game would be rotated amongst the Fiesta Bowl, Sugar Bowl, and Orange Bowl, with the Cotton Bowl dropped from the slate. The Bowl Alliance also awarded its own trophy to the winner of its national championship game.

The Rose Bowl remained independent of the Alliance, leaving open the possibility of a national title going to the Big Ten or Pac-10 Rose Bowl champion rather than the Alliance's champion. This occurred in 1997, when No. 1 Michigan won the Rose Bowl and retained their top ranking in the AP Poll. The Bowl Alliance National Championship Game winner Nebraska split the championship when they passed Michigan in the final Coaches Poll (a result denied by the Coaches Poll to Penn State three years earlier in the same situation).

Bowl Championship Series (1998–2013)

The Bowl Championship Series (BCS), starting in 1998, finally succeeded in bringing the Big Ten and Pac-10 conferences together with the former Coalition and Alliance members for a combined national championship game.

Following the regular season, the BCS paired its No. 1 and No. 2 ranked teams to play for the title in the BCS National Championship Game. This designation initially rotated in order between four BCS Bowls: the Fiesta Bowl, Sugar Bowl, Orange Bowl, and Rose Bowl. For the 2006 season onward the BCS National Championship Game became its own separate contest, played one week later at the site of the bowl in the same rotation.

The original BCS formula incorporated the AP Poll and Coaches Poll along with an average of various computer rankings. The formula underwent many adjustments over the years, including a large overhaul following the 2004 season in which the AP Poll was replaced with the Harris Interactive College Football Poll.

The winners of the BCS National Championship Game were crowned the Coaches Poll national champions and were awarded the Coaches' Trophy on the field following the game. They were also awarded the MacArthur Bowl by the National Football Foundation.

BCS National Championships by school

† USC's victory in the 2005 Orange Bowl and corresponding 2004–05 BCS National Championship was vacated by the BCS.

College Football Playoff (2014–present)

The College Football Playoff (CFP) was designed as a replacement for the BCS. While the NCAA still does not officially sanction the event, organizers sought to bring a playoff system similar to all other levels of NCAA football to the Football Bowl Subdivision.

The College Football Playoff relies on a 13-member selection committee to choose the top four teams to play in a two-round single-elimination playoff bracket. The winner of the final game is awarded the College Football Playoff National Championship Trophy.

CFP National Championships by school

National championship claims

The following tables list schools' known national championship claims at the highest level of play in college football. Some of these schools no longer compete at the highest level, which is currently NCAA Division I FBS, but nonetheless maintain claims to titles from when they did compete at the highest level.

Because there is no one governing or official body that regulates, recognizes, or awards national championships in college football, and because many independent selectors of championships exist, many of the claims by the schools listed below are shared, contradict each other, or are controversial.

In addition, because there is no one body overseeing national championships, no standardized requirements exist in order for a school to make a claim on a national championship, as any particular institution is free to make any declaration it deems to be fit. The majority of these claims, but not all, are based on championships awarded from selectors listed as "major" in the official NCAA Football Bowl Subdivision Records. Not all championships awarded by third party selectors, nor those listed in the official NCAA Football Bowl Subdivision Records, are necessarily claimed by each school. Therefore, these claims represent how each individual school sees their own history on the subject of national championships. For the pre-poll era from 1901 through 1935, 41 major selections of teams from 20 schools have not been used to make national title claims.

The tables below include only national championship claims originating from each particular school and therefore represent the point-of-view of each individual institution.  Each total number of championships, and the years for which they are claimed, are documented by the particular school on its official website, in its football media guide, on a prominent stadium sign, or in other official publications or literature (see Source). If a championship is not mentioned by a school for any particular season, regardless of whether it was awarded by a selector or listed in a third-party publication such as the official NCAA Football Bowl Subdivision Records, it is not considered to be claimed by that institution.

Claims by school

Notes

Claims by year

Other selectors
In addition to the NCAA-designated "major selectors" listed above, various other people and organizations have selected national champions in college football. Selections from such notable selectors are listed below.

Unique championship selections from non-major selectors
Teams in the following table were selected by notable national championship selectors not listed as a "major selector" in the NCAA Football Bowl Subdivision Records book.

In the interest of brevity, this table contains only teams that were not also selected by any NCAA-designated major selector for the given year.

 Teams listed in italics indicate retroactively-applied championships.

See also

 List of NCAA college football rankings
 List of NCAA Division I FBS football programs

Notes

References

External links
 

National Championship
Lists of sports championships
Football
NCAA Division I FBS football
D1 Fbs